The Badger Lakes are a pair of lakes in Murray County, in the U.S. state of Minnesota.

The lakes are more precisely known as North Badger Lake and South Badger Lake.

These lakes were named for the badgers once seen there.

See also
List of lakes in Minnesota

References

Lakes of Minnesota
Lakes of Murray County, Minnesota